The Copa Venezuela is the national cup football competition of Venezuela. Organized by the Venezuelan Football Federation, it is contested in the second half of the season by the teams in the Primera División and Segunda División, excluding reserve teams competing in the lower tier.

Over the years, the competition has had several names. Under its current format, the competition was revived by the FVF in 2007. Its format is similar to the one used for the Spanish Copa del Rey. The champion qualifies to the Copa Sudamericana.

Champions

Titles by club

External links
Copa Venezuela winners on RSSSF

 
Football competitions in Venezuela
Venezuela
Recurring sporting events established in 1959
1959 establishments in Venezuela